Vladimirs Koļesņičenko (born 4 May 1980 in Riga) is a retired Latvian Russian footballer and the former chairman of Latvian Higher League club Skonto Riga.

Career

Club career

Being a member of Skonto Riga footballing system, Koļesņičenko started his career in 1996 with Skonto-Metāls, later joining the same club in 1997, but this time with a different name - Skonto Riga. He played there until 2002, becoming league's top scorer in 2000.

In 2003, he left his native Latvia, joining Russian club Torpedo-Metalurg. After an unsuccessful period with this team (only 7 matches played and no goals scored) he returned to Skonto Riga in 2004. In the same year another challenge from Russia came Koļesņičenko's way, as he joined FC Moscow.

This change was also unsuccessful, and after playing only one match, he yet again returned to Latvia, this time with the newly created and ambitious FK Venta from the city of Kuldīga. The club's ambitions were high, but its finances turned out to be just a bubble as the club went bankrupt and couldn't even manage to finish its first season in the top-flight soccer.

In 2006 Koļesņičenko joined FK Ventspils, playing there for 2 years and becoming a vital first eleven player. In 2009 Vladimirs accepted a challenge from Azerbaijan, joining his fellow international teammates Andrejs Rubins and Ģirts Karlsons at Inter Baku. He soon returned to Latvia, continuing to struggle abroad. Yet again it was Skonto Riga, who took him under their wing.

In 2010, he joined Chornomorets Odesa, but couldn't help the club secure a place in the Ukrainian Premier League. After only six games with no goals he was released. Koļesņičenko faced several personal problems and couldn't find a club for almost a year. In 2011, he was signed yet again by Skonto Riga, where he finished his professional career with ten games and one goal, retiring in August 2011, being just 31 years old.

International career

Koļesņičenko made his international debut for Latvia in 1997, playing 47 international matches and scoring 5 goals. He did not participate at EURO 2004 and finished his international career in 2011.

Later career

After the retirement Koļesņičenko took office as the commercial director of his former club Skonto Riga. On 26 February 2012 Koļesņičenko was elected to become the chairman of the club, with Guntis Indriksons leaving the position. In March 2014 he appeared in a negative light, addressing rude comments towards the Latvian Football Federation via Twitter after Skonto were denied the necessary license for participation in the Latvian Higher League due to long-term debts. He was fined with 280 euros for breaching the code of ethics. The license was later granted after a successful process of appellation and Koļesņičenko deleted his tweets, saying that he would not apologize, though, as the comments had been expressed in a private capacity, not the functional one. His actions were strongly condemned by the LFF. In July 2014 Koļesņičenko resigned from the Skonto Riga president's office and was replaced by Igors Zaicevs. A few days after the resignation, Koļesņičenko's private company SIA SSA bought the Skonto Stadium for 13.8 million euros.

Honours

Club 
 Baltic Cup (1):
 2001

 Champion of Latvia (9):
 1997, 1998, 1999, 2000, 2001, 2002, 2003, 2006, 2007

Individual 
CIS Cup top goalscorer: 2000 (shared)
Virsliga Top Scorer: 2000

Career statistics

Club statistics

* – played games and goals

International goals

Personal life
Vladimirs Koļesņičenko is married and has a child.

References

External links
 
 
 

1980 births
Living people
Latvian people of Ukrainian descent
Latvian footballers
Footballers from Riga
FC Moscow players
Russian Premier League players
FK Ventspils players
Skonto FC players
Shamakhi FK players
FC Chornomorets Odesa players
Ukrainian Premier League players
Expatriate footballers in Ukraine
Expatriate footballers in Russia
Expatriate footballers in Azerbaijan
Latvia international footballers
Latvian expatriate footballers
Latvian expatriate sportspeople in Russia
Latvian expatriate sportspeople in Ukraine
Latvian expatriate sportspeople in Azerbaijan
FK Venta players
Association football midfielders